Nairobi Stima is an association football club based in Nairobi, Kenya. The club currently competes in the Kenyan National Super League.

History
Manager George Owoko led Nairobi Stima to an undefeated first half of the season in 2018–19, but was suspended by management in April 2019 and left the club that June. Assistant coach Evans Mafuta took over as manager.

Stima finished 3rd in 2019 and qualified for the promotion/relegation playoff, but lost to top flight Posta Rangers 3–2 on aggregate and remained in the second division. Nairobi Stima only lost two league matches that year, but missed out on promotion by goal difference to Kisumu All Stars.

Seasons

Source: RSSSF; 2017 Soccerway

Stadium
The team currently plays its home games at the 15,000-capacity Nairobi City Stadium.

References

External links

Kenyan National Super League clubs
FKF Division One clubs
Football clubs in Kenya